Áron Yaakobishvili (born 6 March 2006) is a Hungarian professional footballer currently playing as a goalkeeper for Barcelona.

Club career
Born in Budapest, Hungary, Yaakobishvili trained with local sides Baráti Bőrlabda, Angyalföldi Sportiskolában and MTK Budapest before moving to Spain in 2017. On his arrival in Spain, he had a short spell with amateur side Atlètic Sant Just before moving to Barcelona the following year.

Having progressed through Barcelona's La Masia academy, he signed his first professional contract with the club in February 2022. In March of the same year, he trained with the Barcelona first team.

International career
Yaakobishvili has represented Hungary at youth international level.

Personal life
Yaakobishvili's brother, Antal, plays for fellow Spanish club Girona. The pair are of Georgian descent.

References

2006 births
Living people
Footballers from Budapest
Hungarian footballers
Hungary youth international footballers
Hungarian people of Georgian descent
Association football goalkeepers
MTK Budapest FC players
FC Barcelona players
Hungarian expatriate footballers
Hungarian expatriate sportspeople in Spain
Expatriate footballers in Spain